Cha Seung-won (born June 7, 1970) is a South Korean actor, who began his career as an in-demand fashion model in the 1990s. Cha achieved stardom through the hit comedy films Kick the Moon (2001), Jail Breakers (2002), My Teacher, Mr. Kim (2003), and Ghost House (2004). After proving his versatility in other genres, notably in the period thriller Blood Rain (2005) and the melodrama My Son (2007), Cha's popularity continued with the television series Bodyguard (2003), City Hall (2009), The Greatest Love (2011), Hwayugi (2017), One Ordinary Day (2021), and Our Blues (2022).

Career 
Cha dropped out of Sungkyunkwan University, and began a successful career as a fashion model in 1988. He was cast in the TV sitcom New York Story, which would eventually pave the way for his debut in film.

Although his debut film Holiday In Seoul (1997) and many of his subsequent roles did not establish him as a major star, he attracted attention in 2000 for his performance as an arsonist in the firefighting film Libera Me. The following summer, the runaway success of Kim Sang-jin's comedy Kick the Moon (over 4.3 million tickets sold) secured his place in the industry as a leading actor with strong star appeal. Since then, Cha has become one of the few surefire box office draws in the country. In a 2005 survey of influential movie producers, he was ranked among the top ten most bankable stars.

In early 2003, Cha took on a slightly more serious role as a corrupt schoolteacher who is transferred to a country school in the film My Teacher, Mr. Kim. The film grossed over 2.4 million admissions and drew Cha additional praise for his acting abilities (he would later team up again with director Jang Gyu-seong for 2007 comedy Small Town Rivals). His next role, in Ghost House, reunited him with director Kim Sang-jin in a successful comedy about a man who buys a dream home, only to discover it is haunted by a young female ghost.

In 2005 Cha put aside the comic roles he had become known for and appeared in the grisly period thriller Blood Rain. The film's unexpectedly robust commercial success confirmed Cha's popularity among Korean audiences. He further proved his versatility in Jang Jin's Murder, Take One (also known as The Big Scene).

Cha starred in his first melodrama Over the Border (2006), about a North Korean defector. He then reunited with Jang Jin in My Son (2007), and he said his experience as a father helped a lot in learning the character. Stylish crime thrillers Eye for an Eye (2008), and Secret (2009) followed.

Cha returned to television in 2009, in the political fairytale City Hall penned by writer Kim Eun-sook. 2010 was a busy year for him, with Cha appearing in two films, the Lee Joon-ik-helmed period actioner Blades of Blood, and Korean War film 71: Into the Fire, followed by spy series Athena: Goddess of War.

In 2011 his character in the hit romantic comedy series The Greatest Love, arrogant top star "Dokko Jin," became a mini pop culture phenomenon, giving rise to numerous commercial deals and parodies, as well as awards for Cha.

Cha made his theater debut in 2012 in the stage play Bring Me My Chariot Fire alongside Japanese actors Tsuyoshi Kusanagi, Ryōko Hirosue, Teruyuki Kagawa, and Korean veteran actor Kim Eung-soo. Set in the historically turbulent early 1900s, the plot focuses on the friendship of artists from Korea and Japan who work together to preserve traditional Korean arts.

In 2014, Cha signed with the talent agency YG Entertainment, then starred in the police series You're All Surrounded. This was followed by his third team-up with director Jang Jin in the comedy noir film Man on High Heels, which subverted Cha's "macho" image by having him play a transgender homicide detective.

In 2015, Cha appeared in Three Meals a Day: Gochang Village, a cable reality show set on the remote Manjae Island for which he earned the nickname "Chajumma" (from the word ajumma) because of his versatile cooking skills despite the minimal amount of ingredients and implements. He was then cast as Prince Gwanghae in the period drama Splendid Politics, which focused on power struggles for the throne amid the backdrop of the Joseon Dynasty. Cha next plays cartographer and geologist Kim Jeong-ho in Kang Woo-suk's period epic Gosanja, Daedongyeojido, adapted from Park Bum-shin's novel The Map Maker.

In 2017, Cha was cast in tvN's fantasy romantic comedy drama A Korean Odyssey by the Hong sisters. Cha the starred in the family comedy-drama film Cheer Up, Mr. Lee in 2019 and the disaster film Sinkhole in 2021.

Later in 2021, he starred alongside Kim Soo-hyun in the Coupang Play's television series One Ordinary Day, based on the British television series Criminal Justice. In 2022, he appeared in the tvN drama Our Blues.

Personal life
Cha and his wife Lee Soo-jin are biological parents to daughter Cha Ye-ni (born 2003, christened as Rachel). In July 2014, a man claiming to be the birth father of Cha and Lee's son Cha No-ah (born 1989, christened as Noah) filed (and quickly dropped) a  defamation lawsuit against Cha, which led to the actor admitting that No-ah is Lee's son from her previous marriage, and that when he and Lee got married, Cha legally adopted No-ah, who was then three years old. Cha had previously falsified his marriage date as 1989 to match No-ah's age, apologizing for the white lie since their son did not know his paternity.

Filmography

Film

Television series

Variety shows

Music video appearances

Theater

Awards and nominations

State honors

Listicles

Notes

References

External links

20th-century South Korean male actors
21st-century South Korean male actors
South Korean male film actors
South Korean male television actors
South Korean male models
South Korean Roman Catholics
People from Anyang, Gyeonggi
YG Entertainment artists
Living people
1970 births